Snowland is a historic home located near Leipsic, Kent County, Delaware.  It was built about 1790, and consists of a two-story, five bay, brick main house with a lower wing that extends the main axis.  It was originally built as a three bay dwelling, but later expanded to five bays and a center-hall Georgian-style structure.  It was the birthplace of U.S. Senator Arnold Naudain. (1790-1872)

It was listed on the National Register of Historic Places in 1973.

References

External links

Houses on the National Register of Historic Places in Delaware
Georgian architecture in Delaware
Houses completed in 1790
Houses in Kent County, Delaware
Historic American Buildings Survey in Delaware
National Register of Historic Places in Kent County, Delaware
Leipsic, Delaware